Tsao Chi-hung (born 1 March 1948) is a Taiwanese politician. A member of the Democratic Progressive Party, he was a member of the National Assembly from 1992 to 1994 and has served two terms each in the Legislative Yuan and as Pingtung County Magistrate. Between 2016 and 2017, Tsao was minister of agriculture.

Life before politics
Born in Linbian Township, Pingtung County, Tsao received his bachelor's degree from Chinese Culture University and his master's degree in education from National Kaohsiung Normal University. He worked as the Director of Academic Affairs at Linbian Junior High School from 1978 to 1994.

Political career
Tsao was first elected to political office in 1992 as a member of the National Assembly. In 1994 he was elected as a councillor in the Taiwan Provincial Council, at which point he left his career in education to become a full-time politician. In 1998 Tsao won a seat in the Legislative Yuan representing the Democratic Progressive Party; he was reelected in 2001. In 2004 the Pingtung County magistrate Su Jia-chyuan was appointed Minister of the Interior, leaving the way clear for Tsao to run for county magistrate in 2005. After winning the election in 2005 Tsao was reelected in 2009. He did not stand for reelection in 2014.

After the DPP's landslide win in the 2016 9-in-1 elections, President Tsai Ing-wen appointed Tsao Agriculture Minister in her first cabinet. Tsao stepped down from the position in February 2017.

References

Magistrates of Pingtung County
Living people
1948 births
Members of the 5th Legislative Yuan
Members of the 4th Legislative Yuan
Pingtung County Members of the Legislative Yuan
Democratic Progressive Party Members of the Legislative Yuan
Taiwanese Ministers of Agriculture
Chinese Culture University alumni
National Kaohsiung Normal University alumni